ZimPost is the name under which the Zimbabwe Posts (Pvt) Ltd. trades and is the company responsible for postal service in Zimbabwe.

References

External links
 

Government-owned companies of Zimbabwe
Transport companies of Zimbabwe
Postal system of Zimbabwe
Postal organizations